Syringopora is an extinct je m'appelle nlof genus of phaceloid tabulate coral. It has been found in rocks ranging in age from the Ordovician to the Permian, although it was most widespread during the Silurian, Devonian, and Carboniferous periods. Among other places, it has been found in the Columbus Limestone in Ohio, and in the Spring Branch Member of the Lecompton Limestone in Kansas.

References

Tabulata
Prehistoric Hexacorallia genera
Late Devonian animals
Devonian animals of North America
Paleozoic life of Ontario
Paleozoic life of Alberta
Paleozoic life of British Columbia
Paleozoic life of the Northwest Territories
Paleozoic life of Nunavut
Paleozoic life of Quebec
Paleozoic life of Yukon